St Ann's College is a co-residential college in North Adelaide, South Australia. In its early decades, the college had only female boarders. Today it houses 197 tertiary students, both sexes, in single rooms; rooms in the new buildings have ensuites and all rooms have airconditioning. Residents at St Ann's College have a diverse background with most coming from either rural Australia or overseas. Members of the College attend three universities in South Australia,  University of Adelaide, the University of South Australia and Flinders University. St Ann's College is privately owned and run, and is not funded by government, church or university.

Origin
The college was the brainchild of a group of women graduates of the University of Adelaide, notably Violet Plummer, Helen Mayo, Constance Finlayson, and Pauline Grenfell Price, who in the 1930s saw the need for an equivalent of the residential St Mark's College to accommodate female students from the country and interstate. They approached Sidney Wilcox (1866–1942) of the woolbroking firm Wilcox, Mofflin, who donated £5000 and bequeathed his house on Brougham Place, North Adelaide, to the University for such a facility. St. Ann's College was officially opened with sixteen residential students in 1947, much of the delay being attributable to the War.

College sport
St Ann's College competes against Aquinas College, Lincoln College, Flinders University Hall and St. Mark's College for the Douglas Irving Cup (known to the students as the High Table Cup).
Sports that count for cup points include:
 Tennis
 Swimming
 Basketball
 Debating
 Football (Australian Rules)
 Netball
 Football (Soccer)
 Table tennis
 Hockey
 Volleyball
 Athletics

College Club
The college social and sporting events are organised by the St Ann's College Club, which consists of members elected exclusively by College students.  The college club consists of the following positions:

 President
 Vice-President
 Treasurer
 Secretary
SAAUCC Representative
 Social Secretary
Sport Secretary (two are elected, usually 1 male and 1 female)
 General Representatives (two are elected)
 Technology Representative
 First Year Representative

College tutors

Residential tutors
St Ann's has twelve residential tutors, each in charge of a corridor consisting of approximately 18 students. The tutors provide academic and social leadership, and pastoral care.  They conduct academic monitoring of students in their corridor twice a year together with the Principal.

Each year a Senior Tutor is appointed - usually a tutor from the previous year who has re-applied for tutorship. They coordinate the Tutor group, and take a leadership role within the College.

Academic tutors
Each year senior students are selected into various academic positions for the purpose of tutoring lower year levels in any difficulty they are having.

References

External links
College web site
College location
University of South Australia
Adelaide University
Flinders University

Residential colleges of the University of Adelaide
North Adelaide